Heartless Crew Presents Crisp Biscuit Vol 1 is a compilation album by the Heartless Crew, released in 2002 featuring the MC members of Heartless Crew toasting on several of the tracks.

Track listing

Disc: 1 
Earth, Wind & Fire - "Let's Groove" featuring Specialist Moss, Pickins, Spee, Sweetie Irie, MC Melody, Bushkin, Mighty Moe
George Morel - "Morel's Groove" (Morel's Groove Dub)
The Ant'ill Mob - "Burning"
Big Bird - "Flava"
Reel 2 Real - "I Like to Move It"
Tina Moore - "Never Gonna Let You Go"
Missy Elliott - "Lick Shots"
Tables Have Turned - "Tables Have Turned"
Pretty Boys - "Brass Pocket"
Ice Rider - "Riddim Track"
Mr Reds - "Closer"
Roy Davis Jr. - "Gabrielle"
Pretty Boys - "Sexy Boy"
Heartless Crew - "The Heartless Theme"
Urban Myths - "Makin' Me Feel"
Dave Kelly - "Show Time"
DEA - "Circles"
Menta - "Sounds of da Future"
Smooth - "Undercover Lover"
The Jam Experience - "Feel My Love"
M-Dubs - "Over You"
Donell Jones - "Playa's in the Hood"
Jammin - "Hold On"
DJ Hatcha - "Bashment"

Disc: 2 
Brandy - "I Wanna Be Down"
Shy FX - "Nothing Gonna Stop"
Shy FX - "The Message"
Origin Unknown - "Truly One"
Leftside & Esco - "Double Jeopardy"
DJ SS - "MA2"
Pascal - "P-Funk"
Richard Brownie - "Grass Cyaat"
Dope Skills - "6 Million Ways"
Andy C - "Roll On"
Rohan Fuller - "Rice & Peas Version"
Shy FX - "Funkin Dem Up"
DJ Hype - "Peace Love & Unity"
DJ Stretch & DJ Ride - "Selector"
Nate Dogg - "I Got Love"
Adina Howard - "Freak" (Jungle Mix)
Danny Breaks - "Easy"
Tweet - "Oops Oh My"
The X - "New Dawn"
Shy FX - "Wolf" (Remix)
Kang - "Scatter"
Sunshine Anderson - "Heard It All Before"

References

General

2002 compilation albums
East West Records compilation albums